Mission grapes are a variety of Vitis vinifera introduced from Spain to the western coasts of North and South America by Catholic New World missionaries for use in making sacramental, table, and fortified wines. It is grown in South America, particularly in Chile and Peru, under then names Criolla and Pais. During the 19th century, the grape was known by several other names, including the Los Angeles grape, and the California grape.

History
The original European strain, until recently, had been lost, thus the grapes' being named "Mission grapes" since they were generally grown in  Spanish missions. Prior to 1522, wine was made from grapes native to the area around Mexico City. However, finding the wine produced lacking, it was decreed by Hernán Cortés that sacramental wine was to be made using grapes grown from cuttings from the Old World, and that the grape was to be planted in every Spanish settlement in the New World. Originally brought to Mexico from Spain in the 16th century, they were planted in New Mexico during the early 17th century. Several decades later wine was introduced to present-day Baja California with the establishment of Misión de Nuestra Señora de Loreto Conchó in 1697 by Jesuit priest Juan de Ugarte. While two grape varieties were native to California, Vitis californica, and Vitis girdiana, neither were used for wine production.

The grape was introduced to present-day California in the late 18th century by Franciscan missionaries; the first planting of the grape in present-day California was done by Junipero Serra at Mission San Diego de Alcalá in 1769. The next vines to be planted in present-day California were at Mission San Gabriel Arcángel in 1771, cuttings from this vine would be used to start new vines at Pueblo de Los Ángeles around 1786. Eventually vineyards and wine making expanded to each of the Spanish missions in California. By the last decade of the 18th century, Mission San Gabriel Arcángel was making  of wine. In 1820, the wine made from Mission grapes began to be exported overseas. A dessert wine made from the Mission grapes of the missions gained a reputation of quality in Europe. Making wine was a leading source of revenue for the missions, but ceased after secularization in the 1830s; eventually the vineyards of the missions began to be abandoned.

Until about 1865, Mission grapes represented the entirety of viticulture in California wines. In 1870,  Mission grapes were still described as universal; when eaten as fruit they were "pleasant, and agreeable;". As late as 1888,  of Napa Valley were used to grow Mission grapes. Yet, back in Spain, the vines which the Mission grapes had descended from, were wiped out by phylloxera in all areas except the Canary Islands. During the Prohibition era, the grape largely disappeared from California, with wine made in Mexico smuggled into the United States. One vineyard in Santa Barbara County had sagebrush grown over it, to hide it from being ripped out by prohibitionists; while others were just abandoned. Afterwards it has largely been replaced by noble grape varieties.

Niche resurgence
, the oldest surviving living vine of Mission grape exists at Mission San Gabriel Arcángel, with the oldest vine still bearing fruit being at Avila Adobe. In 2017, most of the state's remaining plantings of the Mission grapes are in the Gold Country, growing in about total . Cultivation has also begun in Baja California, Mexico, where  of century old vines are harvested near Tecate.

Wines
Early accounts of alcoholic beverages made using the Mission grape recall the use of simplistic methods utilizing cowhides, grape treading, and leather bags. The first pressing, producing white wine, later pressings producing red wine, and brandy distilled from the remaining residue. During the 19th century, the Mission grape was used to make strong wines similar to port and sherry. The wine produced by the mission grape was described by Julius Dresel as having "a marked Burgundy flavor,". Yet, that opinion of the wine's taste wasn't shared by all, and it also received negative and unflattering descriptions. The vine has a twisting thick trunk, looking more like a small tree rather than other types of vines. When fruiting, the vines produce "big, heavy, deep-red grape clusters,". It was also written that the grapes of this variety grown in Northern California were called Sonoma grape, while grapes of this variety grown in Southern California were called Los Angeles Grape, with each imparting a distinct flavor compared to the other; elsewhere they were called California grape. Recently, it has been proposed that the Sonoma grape was brought to Northern California from Peru by Russian settlers of Fort Ross in 1817. 

Historically, four types of wines were made from this variety: white, a dry red, a sweet red, and a sweet brandy fortified wine. These historic wines did not age well, and would sour after three years. In the 21st century, the mission variety is grown in Amador, Calaveras, and Santa Barbara counties, as well as in Lodi in San Joaquin County. From these growers, they have produced angelica, dry, and table wines. Other wines made from this variety are natural red, port, sacramental, and sherry. When made into a table wine, it creates a wine described as "very light boddied, yet extremely tannic, often indistinguishable in color from a dark rose, tasting of bitter orange peel and light red fruits, like rhubarb and strawberry.". Angelica made from mission grapes has been described as "unusually sweet," with notes "reminiscent of molasses, dried figs, caramel, nuts and toffee.". Sacramental wine made from this variety has been described as "sickly sweet, with almost no acid to speak".

Though Mission grape vines are heavy producers and can adapt to a variety of climates, table wine made from the fruit tends to be rather characterless, and thus its use in wine making has diminished in modern times. However, as both contemporary accounts and those of the last two centuries attest, angelica, the fortified wine made from the grape, is sometimes a wine of note and distinction; in its angelica form, it has been described as having similar regional importance as port to Portugal, sherry to Spain, and marsala to Sicily. The Mission grape is related to the pink Criolla grape of Argentina, and the red País grape of Chile. Despite being almost extinct in California after a century of being maligned and put down as an inferior grape, recently interest has increased in Mission again. A lot of smaller producers are embracing its long history and the very few plantings still left in the state.  It is a drought resistant plant.

European antecedent
In December 2006, Spanish scholars from the Centro Nacional de Biotecnología in Madrid uncovered the name and origin of the mysterious Mission grape, as well as which were the earliest European vines grown in the Americas. Their findings are due to appear in the journal of the American Society of Enology and Viticulture.  The scholars determined that the Mission grape's DNA matched a little-known Spanish variety called Listan Prieto. Listan is another name for Palomino, although not related to the white grape Palomino Fino used to make Sherry.

See also

History of California wine

Footnotes

References

External links

California wine
New Spain
Pre-statehood history of California
Red wine grape varieties
Grape varieties of Spain